Giò Pomodoro (17 November 1930 – 21 December 2002) was an Italian sculptor, printmaker, and stage designer. His brother is the sculptor Arnaldo Pomodoro.

In 1954 he moved to Milan, where he associated with leading avant-garde artists and started making jewelry. He then began to produce reverse reliefs in clay and also formed assemblages of various materials, including wood, textiles, and plaster subsequently cast in metal.

During the 1960s, he developed several series of sculptures, which explored a range of abstract shapes, usually with smooth undulating surfaces. In his later career, Pomodoro regularly received public commissions and produced a number of large outdoor structures.

Awards and honors
 Lifetime Achievement in Contemporary Sculpture from the International Sculpture Center 2002 
In 2002 the artist was honored with an untitled work in the Simpósio Internacional de Esculturas do Brasil, in Brusque, Santa Catarina, Brazil.

References

1930 births
2002 deaths
Italian contemporary artists
Italian jewellers
20th-century Italian sculptors
20th-century Italian male artists
21st-century Italian sculptors
Italian male sculptors
21st-century Italian male artists